The Eastern pediment of the Temple of Zeus at Olympia depicts the tale of Pelops just before the chariot race wherein he kills the king Oenomaus in order to win the hand of his daughter Hippodamia. The depiction of this chariot race on the east pediment of the Temple of Zeus at Olympia, along with that of the Twelve Labours of Heracles on the metopes of the frieze, relate to the location of the temple in Olympia; the chariot race and Heracles were both believed to have started the tradition of the Olympic Games.

The substantial remains of the pedimental sculptures are now in the Olympia Archaeological Museum.

Description 

In the center stands Zeus watching over Pelops to his right and Oenomaus to his left. Beside them are two female figures, followed by the chariots about to be raced on. In the corners of the pediment are male figures, presumably spectators, who are sitting or lying down in order to fill the narrow space.

Location 
Olympia is in the northwest portion of the Peloponnese. It was a Panhellenic sanctuary, meaning that it was open to all Greeks regardless of the city-state they were a part of. Olympia was also home of the Olympic Games, a Panhellenic athletic tournament occurring every 4 years wherein a sacred truce was declared among the poleis.

Mythology 

In Greek mythology, Pelops had sought to marry Hippodamia. Her father, King Oenomaus, did not want to marry off his daughter, so he challenged each of her suitors to a chariot race. Before Pelops, he had beaten and killed all of these suitors, for he had immortal horses given to him by his father Ares. Pelops, however, called on Poseidon, his former lover, for assistance, and he gave Pelops a gold chariot with winged horses pulling it. Another common view is that Pelops had bribed Oenomaus's charioteer, Myrtilus, into replacing the bronze linchpins of the chariot with ones made of wax. Afterwards, Pelops kills Myrtilus in order to avoid paying the bribe.

References

External links

Temples of Zeus
Ancient Greek sculpture
Pedimental sculpture